The 2014 Women's European Individual Closed Championships is the women's edition of the 2014 European Squash Individual Championships, which serves as the individual European championship for squash players. The event took place in Valenciennes in France from 4 to 7 June 2014. Camille Serme won her third European Individual Championships title, defeating Line Hansen in the final.

Seeds

Draw and results

Finals

See also
2014 Men's European Individual Closed Championships
European Squash Individual Championships

References

External links
European Squash Championships 2014 official website

2014 in squash
Squash in Europe
Squash tournaments in France
2014 in French sport
2014 in women's squash
International sports competitions hosted by France